Amos Betungura was an Anglican bishop in Uganda.

Betungura was educated at Uganda Christian University and ordained deacon in 1957 and priest in 1960. He was consecrated Bishop of Ankole on 6 December 1970. He died in 2008.

References

21st-century Anglican bishops in Uganda
Anglican bishops of Ankole
Uganda Christian University alumni
2008 deaths
Year of birth missing